Clay Township is one of ten townships in Andrew County, Missouri, United States. As of the 2010 census, its population was 259.

The township was named after Henry Clay, a Kentucky statesman.

Geography

The streams of Newland Creek, Owl Creek and Pedlar Creek run through this township.

Transportation
Clay Township contains one airport, Lazy W Farms Airport.

References

 USGS Geographic Names Information System (GNIS)

External links
 US-Counties.com
 City-Data.com

Townships in Andrew County, Missouri
Townships in Missouri